900 Biscayne Bay is a skyscraper in Miami, Florida, United States. It is located in northeastern Downtown, on Biscayne Bay along the west side of Biscayne Boulevard. It opened for residential occupancy in early 2008. The building currently stands as the 7th-tallest building in Miami and in the state of Florida, behind the Four Seasons Hotel Miami, Southeast Financial Center and Marquis Miami. It also stands as tallest all-residential building in the city and the state. 900 Biscayne Bay is located across the street from Ten Museum Park, another recently completed Miami residential high-rise, near Museum Park and American Airlines Arena in northern Biscayne Boulevard. It is also adjacent to the Park West Metromover station. Originally planned to rise 712 feet (217 m) and 65 floors, the building went through a height reduction during its construction, with a decorative rooftop spire and two floors being removed from the final plans.

The 1.5 million square foot (139,000 m²) tower will have 516 residential condominiums and 800 parking spaces. There are eleven typical units on each of the lower floors, with two-level townhomes and penthouses on the uppermost floors. The bottom three floors will consist of a three-story lobby, retail shops, restaurant and outdoor café. The three storey main lobby is located 18 ft above the ground and there is a separate porte cochere entrance and lobby for the offices.

Post-tensioned slabs with concrete shear walls and columns (up to 12 ksi strength) comprised the primary structure, but other aspects for this project required innovative and creative analysis (e.g., site settlement during construction, creep/shortening analysis of vertical members and effects on slab levelness, quantifying creep and designing slabs between shear walls with the goal of eliminating pour strips.) The primary structural design for this project was performed in less than 3 months in order to meet overall project scheduling needs.

Gallery

See also
 List of tallest buildings in Miami
 Downtown Miami
 List of tallest buildings in Florida

References

External links 
 900 Biscayne Bay - SkyscraperCenter
 900 Biscayne Bay - Emporis
 900 Biscayne Bay- SkyscraperPage
 Designbuild-network.com Project Profile

Residential buildings completed in 2008
Residential condominiums in Miami
Residential skyscrapers in Miami
2008 establishments in Florida